Larisa Pavlovna Tarkovskaya (née Yegorkina (Егоркина), from 1958, Kizilova (Кизилова); 1 February 1933 – 19 January 1998) was a Soviet film director and actress.

She was the second wife of filmmaker Andrei Tarkovsky. She and Tarkovsky married in 1964 and had one child named Andrei.

Life
Larisa Pavlovna Yegorkina was born on 1 February 1933 in Moscow, Soviet Union to Pavel Vasilyevich Yegorkin, an engineer and Anna Semyonovna, a seamstress. Her parents, who were originally from the village of Avdotyinka, Shilovsky District, Ryazan Oblast, had settled in the capital in 1925.

She married the engineer, Igor Kizilov, and in 1958 gave birth to their daughter Olga Kizilova. While filming Andrei Rublev, Kizilova, who had been a production assistant for the film, and Tarkovsky met and they started a relationship. In 1965, Tarkovsky moved in with Kizilova despite still being married to his first wife, Irma Raush. 

In 1970, Tarkovsky divorced his first wife and married Kizilova a few months later. Their son, Andrei Andreyevich Tarkovsky, (nicknamed Andriosha, meaning "little Andrei" or "Andrei Junior") was born the same year on 7 August.

Death

Tarkovsky died of lung cancer in Paris on 29 December 1986 and was buried in January 1987 in the Russian Cemetery in Sainte-Geneviève-des-Bois, France. The inscription on his gravestone, which was erected in 1994, was conceived by his wife and reads: To the man who saw the Angel. Tarkovskaya died in Neuilly-sur-Seine, Hauts-de-Seine, France on 19 January 1998 and was laid to rest beside her husband.

Filmography

As assistant director   
1966: Andrei Rublev 
1972: Solaris (credited as L. Tarkovskaya)
1975: Mirror 
1979: Stalker 
1983: Nostalghia (credited as Larissa Tarkovsky)

As actress 
1975: Mirror : Nadejda

Documentary appearances
1987: One Day in the Life of Andrei Arsenevich (credited as Larissa Tarkovski)
1988: The Exile and Death of Andrei Tarkovsky 
2000: Cinéma, de notre temps, episode Une journée d'Andreï Arsenevitch

Bibliography 
1997: Andrei Tarkovski (in French)

References

External links
https://www.imdb.com/name/nm0850490/

1933 births

1998 deaths